The men's 10,000 meter at the 2011 KNSB Dutch Single Distance Championships took place in Heerenveen at the Thialf ice skating rink on Sunday 7 November 2010. Although this tournament was held in 2010 it was part of the speed skating season 2010–2011. There were 11 participants.

Statistics

Result

Source:

Draw

References

Single Distance Championships
2011 Single Distance